Alison Taylor (born March 12, 1987) is a Canadian curler from Iqaluit, Nunavut. She currently plays lead on Team Brigitte MacPhail.

Career
Taylor represented Nunavut at two Canadian Curling Club Championships in 2018 and 2021. At the 2018 Travelers Curling Club Championship, her team skipped by Chantelle Mason finished the round robin with a 1–5 record. Three years later at the 2021 Canadian Curling Club Championships, she once again finished 1–5 playing second for Denise Hutchings. Also during the 2021–22 season, Taylor joined the Nunavut women's team of Brigitte MacPhail, Sadie Pinksen and Kaitlin MacDonald to compete in the 2022 Scotties Tournament of Hearts. MacPhail lives in Halifax, Nova Scotia, and played with the team as their designated out-of-province curler. The team finished with a winless 0–8 record at the national championship.

Personal life
Taylor works as a senior policy analyst for the Government of Nunavut. She is in a relationship with Justin McDonell.

Teams

References

External links

1987 births
Canadian women curlers
Living people
Curlers from Nunavut
People from Iqaluit
Curlers from Toronto
Sportspeople from North York
21st-century Canadian women